Amotus is a genus of broad-nosed weevils in the beetle family Curculionidae. There are at least three described species in Amotus.

Species
These three species belong to the genus Amotus:
 Amotus longipennis Pierce, 1909 i c g
 Amotus seniculus (Horn, 1876) i c g
 Amotus setulosus (Schönherr, 1847) i c g b
Data sources: i = ITIS, c = Catalogue of Life, g = GBIF, b = Bugguide.net

References

Further reading

 
 
 
 

Entiminae
Articles created by Qbugbot